The Seungjeongwon was the Royal Secretariat during the Joseon dynasty of Korea (1392–1910) in charge of receiving and delivering the king's order. The office was also called Jeongwon, Huwon, Eundae, or Daeeonsa. According to the Gyeongguk daejeon (Complete Codes of Law), the Seungjeongwon had six royal secretaries (Seungji 承旨), whose ranks were in the 3rd senior grade, as well as two recorders (juseo 注書). The duties of the royal secretaries were primarily to deliver the monarch's orders to government organizations (under the Joseon administrative system the monarch never delivered his orders directly to any government office) and to report on official affairs of the state organizations to the throne. The six secretary system is explained by the fact that the government of Joseon was composed of six boards (or ministries). The six secretaries served respectively the Boards of Personnel, War, Taxation, Rites, Works, and Punishment. However, the secretaries were not limited to liaison work between the six boards and the monarch; they also reported to the king the business of all government offices, primary among these being the State Council (Uijeong-bu), the Office of Censor-General (Saganwon), and the Office of Inspector-General (Saheon-bu). As the name implies, the primary duty of the recorders was to make a record of all the official business handled by the secretaries. As the work of the secretaries had to be conducted at all hours, and it was required that they have ready access to the monarch at all times, the office of the Seungjeongwon was established within easy reach of the king at court. 

The records of the Seungjeongwon were compiled into the Seungjeongwon ilgi (Diary of the Royal Secretariat), which remains a primary source for the study of the Joseon dynasty.

See also 
History of Korea
Joseon Dynasty politics

References 

Politics of Korea
Joseon dynasty